Pollitzer is a surname. Notable people with the surname include:

 Adolf Pollitzer (1832–1900), a Hungarian Jewish violinist
 Alois Pollitzer, original name of Louis Treumann (1872–1943), Austrian actor and operetta tenor
 Anita Pollitzer, American photographer
 Marcel Pollitzer, French writer
 William S. Pollitzer, American anatomist

See also
 Politzer